Ouagadougou Cathedral, or the Cathedral of the Immaculate Conception of Ouagadougou is the cathedral of the Roman Catholic Archdiocese of Ouagadougou in Ouagadougou, the capital of Burkina Faso. It was built in the 1930s, by apostolic vicar Joanny Thévenoud from the White Fathers, at the time of French North Africa, and was dedicated on 19 January 1936, after a two-year construction. Behind the cathedral, near the carpark, is an altar dedicated to Mary, Ave Maria, with a statue of the Virgin in a carved stone arch.

References

20th-century Roman Catholic church buildings
Buildings and structures in Ouagadougou
Churches in Burkina Faso
Roman Catholic cathedrals in Burkina Faso
Romanesque Revival church buildings
Roman Catholic churches completed in 1936